The 1998 United States Senate election in Ohio was held November 3, 1998. It was concurrent with elections to the United States House of Representatives. Incumbent Democratic U.S Senator John Glenn decided to retire, instead of seeking a fifth term. Republican Governor George Voinovich won the open seat.

Candidates

Democratic 
 Mary Boyle, former Cuyahoga County Commissioner and candidate in 1994

Republican 
 George Voinovich, Governor and nominee in 1988

Results

See also 
 1998 United States Senate elections

References 

United States Senate
Ohio
1998